Ireland competed at the 2022 European Championships in Munich from August 11 to August 22, 2022, winning four medals.

Medalists

Competitors
The following is the list of number of competitors in the Championships:

Athletics

Gymnastics

Ireland has entered five male and five female athletes.

Men

Qualification

Women

Qualification

Rowing

Men

Women

Mixed

References

2022
Nations at the 2022 European Championships
European Championships